Josie Barnes (née Earnest, b. June 28, 1988) is one of the top female professional ten-pin bowlers currently competing in the Professional Women's Bowling Association (PWBA). She has four PWBA Tour titles to date, including a major championship at the 2021 U.S. Women’s Open, in which she won a PWBA-record $100,000 first prize. Barnes is a nine-time member of Team USA, and is also the associate head coach for the women’s bowling team at her alma mater, Vanderbilt University.

Barnes is a pro staff member for Storm Bowling, and is also sponsored by VISE grips and CoolWick sportswear.

Amateur career
At Vanderbilt University, Barnes (then Josie Earnest) was a member of the team that won the 2007 NCAA Women’s Bowling Championships, and was voted Most Outstanding Player of this event. She was named a second team All-American in 2007, and a first team All-American in each of the next three seasons (2008–2010). Josie was voted NTCA Division I Player of the Year in the 2008 and 2009 seasons.  In 2008, she was voted by the Tennessee Sports Hall of Fame as co-winner of the Female Amateur Athlete of Year award (with University of Tennessee basketball player Candace Parker).  She was a 2013 inductee into the Vanderbilt Athletic Hall of Fame.

Barnes was a five-time member of Junior Team USA (2005 and 2007–2010), and is a nine-time member of Team USA (2012, 2013 and 2015–2021).

As a junior player, Barnes won four gold medals (singles, trios, team and all-events) at the 2008 Pan American Bowling Confederation (PABCON) Youth Championships.  As an adult, she won one gold medal (team) and one bronze medal (Masters) at the 2012 PABCON Championships. At the 2016 PABCON Championships, she won a gold medal in trios and a silver medal in team competition. She then won a bronze medal in doubles at the 2017 World Bowling Women’s Championships.

Professional career
Barnes joined the PWBA in 2015, the organization’s first season since returning from an 11-year hiatus (2004–2014). Prior to this, she made her first professional telecast at the 2012 U.S. Women's Open, finishing fifth. After a mostly unsuccessful 2015 campaign, she broke through with her first professional title at the PWBA Rochester Open, the tenth event of the 2016 season.

She went on to win two more standard titles in 2018 and 2019, then won her first major championship in the 2021 U.S. Women's Open. At this event, Barnes earned the #1 seed in qualifying, and won her lone finals match against Singapore’s Cherie Tan by a score of 198–194. The winner’s share for the tournament was a PWBA-record $100,000.

PWBA Tour titles
Major championships are in bold text.

 2016 PWBA Rochester Open (Rochester, NY)
 2018 PWBA East Hartford Open (East Hartford, CT)
 2019 Nationwide PWBA Greater Cleveland Open (Cleveland, OH)
 2021 U.S. Women’s Open (Rohnert Park, CA)

Personal
Originally from Vandalia, Illinois, Barnes says she grew up in her parents’ 12-lane bowling center. She played softball and tennis in high school, “but always knew that bowling was what I wanted to do.”

Following high school, Barnes moved to Nashville, Tennessee to attend Vanderbilt University. She earned her degree in Human and Organizational Development and decided to stay in the area following graduation. She married Kyle Barnes in 2017, and the couple has one daughter (Lisa Ruth).

References

1988 births
Living people
People from Vandalia, Illinois
American ten-pin bowling players